Andre Agassi Tennis is a tennis video game released in 1992, starring tennis legend Andre Agassi. The game was released for the Super Nintendo Entertainment System, Genesis, Master System, and Game Gear. It enjoyed a much belated release for mobile phones.

Gameplay
The player can play in either career mode, exhibition mode, or practice mode where the player can learn to hit and receive tennis balls in a proper manner in order to assure victory on the tennis court.

During the career mode, the player travels to tennis courts around the world and compete in tournaments where victory allows the player to win money. After mastering all the tournaments, the player actually plays against Mr. Andre Agassi in a final grudge match in order to determine who is the best tennis player in the world. All the other players are generic except for him.

Reception

References

External links

1992 video games
Master System games
Game Gear games
Sega Genesis games
Super Nintendo Entertainment System games
Mobile games
Tennis video games
Video games developed in the United States
Multiplayer and single-player video games
Agassi, Andre
Cultural depictions of Andre Agassi
TecMagik games